Wān Na-mon or Wan Namon, is a village in Langkho Township, Langkho District, southern Shan State.

Geography
Wān Na-mon lies at the border with Mae Hong Son Province, Thailand, in a mountainous area, 11 km to the east of Loi Lan mountain, 14 km to the south of Homein and 5 km east from Wān Mae Aw.

Further reading
 Map - Districts of Shan (South) State

References

Populated places in Shan State
Myanmar–Thailand border